The 1998 Tripura Legislative Assembly election took place in a single phase on 16 February to elect the Members of the Legislative Assembly (MLA) from each of the 60 Assembly Constituencies (ACs) in Tripura, India. Counting of votes occurred on 2 March 1998. The results were ready within the day.

The Communist Party of India (Marxist) (CPI(M)), led by Manik Sarkar, won 38 seats and formed a Government in Tripura

Highlights
Election to the Tripura Legislative Assembly were held on February 16, 1998.  The election were held in a single phase for all the 60 assembly constituencies.

Participating Political Parties
Source:

No. of Constituencies
Source:

Electors
Source:

Performance of Candidates by gender
Source:

Results

Constituency-wise Winners

Government Formation
The Communist Party of India (Marxist) (CPI(M)), led by Manik Sarkar, won 38 seats and formed a Government in Tripura

References

State Assembly elections in Tripura
Tripura